Tommaso Corsini (28 February 1835 – 22 May 1919) was an Italian politician. He was born in and was mayor of Florence. He served in the Senate of the Kingdom of Italy. He died in Marsiliana, province of Grosseto, Tuscany.

Honors
Order of Saints Maurice and Lazarus
Order of the Crown of Italy
Order of Saint Stanislaus (Russian Empire)
Order of Saint Joseph (Grand Duchy of Tuscany)

See also
 List of Italians

References

External links

1835 births
1919 deaths
19th-century Italian politicians
Mayors of Florence
Knights of the Order of Saints Maurice and Lazarus
Presidents of the Province of Florence
National Union (Italy, 1947) politicians